The Great Western Railway (GWR) 6800 Class or Grange Class was a mixed-traffic class of 4-6-0 steam locomotive, built to replace the GWR 4300 Class 2-6-0. There were 80 in the class, all built at the Swindon works, using some reconditioned parts from withdrawn 4300 Class locomotives.

Background
The GWR locomotive standardisation policy pursued by George Jackson Churchward envisaged a range of locomotive classes which would be suitable for the majority of duties, and yet which would share a small number of standard components. Amongst the designs suggested in 1901 was a 4-6-0 with  diameter driving wheels, and the Standard No. 1 boiler. Although planned in 1901, none were built during Churchward's lifetime. C.B. Collett, (Churchward's successor at Swindon Works) rather introduced the Hall class with  diameter driving wheels.

The 4300 Class of 2-6-0 tender locomotives had been introduced on the GWR for mixed traffic duties in 1911, and by 1932 there were 342 in service. However, by the mid 1930s some of the earlier examples were in need of attention and the class as a whole was struggling with some of the duties expected of them. Collett therefore revived the Churchward proposal, but modified the design to include a cab and controls to the current style.
Between 1936 and 1939, one hundred 4300 Class were taken out of service and replaced by new 4-6-0 locomotives, eighty of which were of the 6800 (or Grange) class, whilst the remaining 20 were of the 7800 (or Manor) class. It had been intended to replace all of the 4300 Class in this way, but the Second World War stopped the programme.

Design and Production
The Granges were effectively a smaller-wheeled version of the Hall Class.

The wheels, valve motion and tenders were taken from the withdrawn engines, reconditioned and then used in the construction of the 100 new locomotives; the components from one old locomotive were spread amongst more than one of the new engines. This was done in order to make the cylinders level with the axles, but still allow the use of the old valve motion parts.

The locomotives were built in two batches to a single order (Lot No. 308): Nos. 6800-6859 were built between August 1936 and December 1937, and Nos. 6860-6879 appeared between February and May 1939. They were all named after Granges in the area covered by the GWR. Further construction of the class was cancelled due to the outbreak of war. They were originally fitted with Churchward  tenders taken from withdrawn members of the 4300 Class. However, after the second world war several were fitted with newer  and  types.

Performance
Although built to a thirty five-year-old design, in service they proved to be reliable performers. With their power and mixed traffic characteristics they could handle most duties on the network. Their smaller driving wheels giving them a higher tractive effort than the Hall Class. They were often used for the haulage of perishable goods, such as fruit and broccoli, and for excursion trains. However their axle loading prevented their use on some cross-country routes previously operated by the 4300 class. As a result, a lighter version in the form of the Manor Class was introduced for these duties.

The BR power classification of the Grange class was 5MT, its GWR power class was D and its route availability colour code was red.

Accidents

Withdrawal and Preservation
The entire class was withdrawn from service between 1960 and 1965 and no examples were preserved. 6853 Morehampton Grange was a candidate for preservation by the GWS at Didcot, but Manor class 7808 Cookham Manor was purchased instead. However, GWR 6880 Betton Grange, the next Grange that was due to be built originally, was constructed between approximately 2005 and 2022 at the Llangollen Railway and Tyseley Locomotive Works.

List of Locomotives

See also 
 List of GWR standard classes with two outside cylinders

References

External links 

 Great Western Railway archive entry on the 6800 class
 Railways on line entry
 Website of the Grange Project

 
6800
4-6-0 locomotives
Railway locomotives introduced in 1936
Standard gauge steam locomotives of Great Britain
2′C h2 locomotives
Scrapped locomotives